Tegenaria croatica is a funnel-web spider found in Croatia.

See also 
 List of Agelenidae species

References 

croatica
Spiders of Europe
Spiders described in 2013